Rosalinda Rodríguez is a Mexican stage and TV actress known for her work in telenovelas for Telemundo, Telemundo and Vene vision.

Career

References

External links
 

Living people
Mexican telenovela actresses
Year of birth missing (living people)